The 2012–13 season was Falkirk's third consecutive season in the Scottish First Division, having been relegated from the Scottish Premier League at the end of season 2009–10. Falkirk also competed in the Challenge Cup, League Cup and the Scottish Cup.

Summary

Season
During season 2012–13 Falkirk finished third in the Scottish First Division. They reached the second round of the Challenge Cup, the second round of the League Cup and the Semi-final of the Scottish Cup.

Management
Falkirk began the season under the management of Steven Pressley. On 8 March 2013, Pressley left the club to take up the manager post at Coventry City after compensation was agreed. The club's technical director Alex Smith took over as interim manager with Stevie Crawford acting as his assistant.

On 3 April, the club announced that Gary Holt would take over as manager from 8 April 2013.

Results & fixtures

Pre season
A match against Stenhousemuir scheduled for 24 July, was cancelled.

Scottish First Division

Scottish Challenge Cup

Scottish League Cup

Scottish Cup

Player statistics

Captains

Squad
Last updated 8 May 2013

|}

Disciplinary record
Includes all competitive matches.
Last updated 8 May 2013

Team statistics

League table

Division summary

Transfers

Players in

Players out

References

Falkirk
Falkirk F.C. seasons